Quaid-e-Azam Zindabad is a 2022 Pakistani action comedy film written by Fizza Ali Meerza and Nabeel Qureshi, directed by Nabeel Qureshi, and produced by Mehdi Ali and Fizza Ali Meerza, under the banners of Filmwala Pictures. The film stars Fahad Mustafa, Javed Sheikh and Mahira Khan with Nayyar Ejaz and Mehmood Aslam in an ensembled cast.

The filming had been completed before the lockdown restrictions started due to the COVID-19 pandemic. Post-production was done in 2020 Distributed by Hum Films and Eveready Pictures, the film was released after a two years delay on Eid al-Adha, 8 July 2022 and opened to mixed reviews from critics.

Plot
While performing his crime-fighting duties in Karachi, Inspector Gulab requests D.I.G. Babar to stop his promotion so he can continue collecting bribes under him, who works for Rana, a corrupt politician who owns a lion at his place. One day while on duty, Gulab encounters Jia, whose cell phone was snatched while she was rescuing pets. He recovers her cellphone as he falls for her, and starts giving her different pets for her animal shelter in an attempt to grow closer to her, but he does not seem to be interested in petting them as he loses control over her hamster.

Gulab continues to thug common peddlers and threatens some to leave the place for the VIPs who have heavily paid him bribes; most of it is kept in a secret locker at Rana's place while Gulab himself keeps some of it. Later, when Munir, Gulab's father, discovers that he secretly stores the bribes he collects in his house, Munir dies in pain that even his son has ignored the lesson he taught him 20 years back to respect Muhammad Ali Jinnah, and began to follow the corrupt ones. Mourning Gulab, he still ignores the fact that his father raised him on Halal income as he preferred his will over his father's commands, so he finds Jinnah's pictures missing on Pakistani rupee notes, which his assistant, Ronaq, also notices assuming that Jinnah supervises their earnings and now he is upset about what they did. To confirm what they saw, they share awareness about Jinnah's respect towards those who had Haram income, and soon those people also find Jinnah's picture missing, including Babar and Rana; thus, their currency notes now seem fake.

As Jia gets angry learning about Gulab's deeds, Gulab realizes all his mistakes and turns over a new leaf. He returns the money with an apology note by following the list of people his team has made. He beats an officer publicly upon misbehaving with a peddler, which sparks controversy. However, he also offers his seniors, Babar and Rana, to ask Jinnah for an apology at Mazar-e-Quaid, which Rana ignores and instead requests the bill in assembly about either completely removing Jinnah's picture from the currency notes or instead start using US$. Multiple public protests rose against this act and against owning a jungle animal on his private property; the latter protest was led by Jia.

Soon, Gulab tries to seek warrants against Rana as he discloses the bribes collected. Instead, he breaks in there over Jia's complaint, after which the lion is handed over to the police, who will now safely move it to the jungle. Meanwhile, Rana tries to escape by burning his house and informing Babar; however, Gulab recovers all the money from Rana's private jet and blows the money raining in the city for common people as he gets an order from Babar who also realizes his true duty, while Gulab drowns with the jet in the Clifton Beach, Karachi. Rana is arrested and imprisoned as the police de-route him, and a revived Gulab appears there to slap Rana for his corrupt behaviors.

As Gulab gets free of this case, he witnesses Jinnah's picture reappear on his salary which he receives for the first time in a while, assuming that his father, Munir, and the Father of the Nation, Jinnah, are now happy with his acts. He accepts his promotion and with his salary, he and Jia express love for each other and propose to marry.

Cast
 Fahad Mustafa as Inspector Gulab Mughal, an S.H.O. in Sindh Police
 Usman as young Gulab Mughal
 Mahira Khan as Jia, a veterinarian, animal lover, and activist
 Jawed Sheikh as Ronaq Ali, a Sindhi constable who is Gulab's assistant
 Mehmood Aslam as Babar Jilani, Deputy Inspector General of Sindh Police, Gulab's senior
 Nayyar Ejaz as Rana Kamran, a corrupt politician
 Qavi Khan as Munir Mughal, Gulab's father who is a retired inspector
 Faiq Khan as young Munir Mughal, an honest police inspector
 Irfan Motiwala as Saleem, a faithful sub-inspector
 Beo Raana Zafar as a food cart owner who sells bun kebabs
 Sami Khan as Jia's friend
 Saleem Mairaj as a corrupt sub-inspector, Cameo Appearance
 Asad Ali Palijo as Ali Abbas, a police constable
 Nabeel Qureshi, special appearance in the song "Loota Rey"
 Faryal Mehmood as a TikToker, special appearance

Production
The film title and genre were announced on 26 August 2019 by Filmwala Pictures' duo Nabeel Qureshi and Fizza Ali Meerza, with Fahad Mustafa joining on 18 September while Mahira Khan on 22 October. While this is Mustafa's fifth collaboration with the filmmakers, Khan joined the team for the first time as a lead for this film as she had few other options with them too. Filming took place in Karachi from December 2019 and wrapped on 15 February 2020 with more than 50 days of principal photography.

Initially planned for release on Eid al-Adha, August 2020, the film then went into the post-production phase, but the release got delayed due to the COVID-19 pandemic in Pakistan as the filmmakers refused to release it digitally due to being a big-budget film. The lead character posters were revealed on 14 August 2020.

Mustafa did most of the stunts himself and endured multiple injuries, including the serious one in his heel, and he did not allow the stunt double as he plays a corrupt cop; the film title is the term used to define the act of bribery, a social issue in Pakistan. Khan especially learnt to ride a bike for the film as she plays an animal lover; to define her character, different animals were in this film, including lion, dogs, parrot, hamster, donkey, crocodile, and snake; all the animals were taken care by Azlan Shah, an animal enthusiast. The film went through three different studios for VFX; Artlab, Sharp Image, and Postistan. The teaser, released on 17 October, announced the film release to be on Jinnah's Birthday weekend, 25 December 2020, but it got postponed once again due to the policies by the National Command and Operation Center until the next decision in October 2021.

Soundtrack

The song "Loota Rey" is choreographed by Nigah Hussain; it was launched in a ceremony at Port Grand on 25 June.

Release
The final release date was announced on 1 January 2022, and the trailer was released in a ceremony at the Arts Council of Pakistan Karachi on 9 June. The film was premiered on 5 July in Universal Cinemas, Emporium Mall, Lahore, and on 9 July in Nueplex Cinemas, DHA, Karachi. It had a worldwide release on 8 July with complete release in Pakistan on Eid al-Adha, 10 July. In UAE, it released on 7 July.

Reception
Sadiq Saleem from Khaleej Times opined that the film is a "good watch for the festive season". Writing for The Brown Identity, Mahwash Ajaz praised the film and said that while Fahad has been made "the larger-than-life hero," the hero "is still the message". Rabia Mughni of Fuchsia Magazine praised that the film delivers "top-notch production quality" with "the above-par and well-executed action sequences", however, she criticized the climax as it "didn't evoke ample excitement". Kamran Jawaid of Dawn commented that the film "strives to be grand and entertaining but falls short of expectations". Syeda Zehra wrote for Something Haute, "The filmmakers have discovered all the right buttons for an action entertainer; now they have to work on the shortcomings to lift its appeal." Asfa Sultan commented for The Express Tribune that the film "is a thrilling watch" but its "loop-holes and lacklustre storytelling" could have been better. Fifi Haroon criticized the role of Nayyar Ejaz and the lengthy screenplay, however, she praised the romance between the leads and wanted more of it; she claimed the film to be a political parody.

See also
 London Nahi Jaunga

Notes

References

External links
 
 

2022 films
2020s action comedy-drama films
2022 action comedy films
2020s Urdu-language films
Pakistani action comedy-drama films
Films shot in Karachi
Hum films
Urdu-language Pakistani films